Indian independence may refer to:
Independence Day (India), India's national day marking independence from the British Empire
Indian Independence Act 1947, an act of the Parliament of the United Kingdom that granted de facto independence to India and Pakistan
Partition of India, the split of British India into modern India and Pakistan
Indian independence movement, the one for self-rule in British India
Native American self-determination, including independence movements among American Indians